Sefrou is one of the provinces of the Fès-Meknès region of Morocco. It had a population of 259,577 as per the Census Report of 2004.

Cities

The major cities and towns are: 
 Ain Cheggag
 Bhalil
 El Menzel
 Imouzzer Kandar
 Ribate El Kheir
 Sefrou
 Zaouiat Bougrine

Subdivisions
The province is divided administratively into the following:

References

 
Sefrou Province